Eternally refers to the state of existing for eternity. It may also refer to:

Music

Songs
Eternally (1952 song), a song with music by Charlie Chaplin and lyrics by Geoff Parsons that has been covered by many artists
"Eternally (Wanting You, Needing You)" Jackie Walker (singer), 1958
"Eternally", a rockabilly song by Jane Bowman, 1961
"Eternally", a song by The Chantels, 1963
Eternally (Hikaru Utada song)

Other
Eternally (film), a 1957 film produced by Sampaguita Pictures